Treherne (South Norfolk Airpark) Aerodrome  is located  northeast of Treherne, Manitoba, Canada.

See also
Treherne Airport

References

Registered aerodromes in Manitoba